Jet of Iada a.k.a. Jet (21 July 1942 – 18 October 1949) was a German Shepherd Dog, who assisted in the rescue of 150 people trapped under blitzed buildings. He was a pedigree dog born in Liverpool, and served with the Civil Defence Services of London. He was awarded both the Dickin Medal and the RSPCA's Medallion of Valor for his rescue efforts.

Early life
Jet was born in Liverpool in the Iada kennel of Mrs Babcock Cleaver in July 1942. He was a black German Shepherd Dog, and in the kennel was initially called Jett, with his full pedigree name being Jet of Iada.  He was loaned to be trained at the War Dogs School in Gloucester from the age of nine months, where he was trained in anti-sabotage work. Following eighteen months work on airfields performing anti-sabotage duties he was returned to the school for further training in search and rescue duties where he was partnered with Corporal Wardle.

They were relocated to London. Corporal Wardle and Jet were the first handler and dog to be used in an official capacity in Civil Defence rescue duties.

Awards
He was awarded the Dickin Medal on 12 January 1945 for saving the lives of over fifty people trapped in bombed buildings. The dedication read "For being responsible for the rescue of persons trapped under blitzed buildings while serving with the Civil Defence Services of London." Following the war, he was returned to his owner in Liverpool.  The Dickin Medal is often referred to as the animal metaphorical equivalent of the Victoria Cross.

On 15 August 1947, an explosion occurred in the William Pit near Whitehaven, Cumbria. Dogs trained in body recovery work were unavailable, so two dogs were sent from the RAF Police Dog School at Staverton, and Jet was collected from his owner on the journey north. After his efforts helped save the rescuers he was awarded the RSPCA's Medallion of Valor.

There is a memorial to Jet in the English flower garden of Calderstones Park, Liverpool near where he is buried.  This memorial was cleaned in July 2016 by pupils of Childwall Church of England Primary School and The Reader in celebration of Jet's Birthday.  Also in attendance was 93 year old Lilias Ward (née Cleaver) Jet's former owner....

Pedigree

Jet's Family Tree

See also
List of individual dogs

References

External links
 PDSA Dickin Medal, including "Roll of Honor" PDF

Individual dogs
German shepherds
Recipients of the Dickin Medal
1942 animal births
1949 animal deaths
Detection dogs